Sergey Viktorovich Koplyakov (born 23 January 1959) is a Russian-Belarusian swimmer who won two gold medals competing for the Soviet Union at the 1980 Summer Olympics.

Sergey Koplyakov moved into top ranks of world swimming in 1979, coming behind Vladimir Salnikov, Andrey Krylov and Volodymyr Raskatov, enabling the Soviet Union to fully compete in male freestyle with American champions in the late 1970s. In sports history, Koplyakov will be the swimmer who ended 15 years of American domination in the 200 m freestyle and the first man who bested the time of 1:50 (on 7 April 1979 he achieved 1:49.83 in East Berlin).

Born in Orsha, Belarus' 11th-largest city, Koplyakov debuted in 1974, at the age of 15. He won the 200 m juniors in a people's tournament in 1969. From Minsk he went to Leningrad, one of the pilot centers of the new Soviet swimming and was selected in 1976 for the Montreal Olympic Games, where he won a silver medal in the 4×200 m. His best time in 200 m that year was 1:53.37. In 1977 he was very discreet, only got a fifth place in the 200 m of the European Championships. In 1978, in the West Berlin World Championships, he finished third in the 200 m, behind two Americans with a time of 1:51.33 (new European record). He achieved high recognition in 1978, beating on 7 April the 200 m world record, during the first split of one 4×200 m relay in a GDR/USSR meeting; after that he won the 100 m in 51.46 and the 200 m of the Europe Cup (London) in August and finally the 200 m of the Spartakiad in Moscow in September with 1:50.13, showing himself as one of the most serious opponents for the American swimmers.

See also
 World record progression 200 metres freestyle

References 
YouTube heat 200 m freestyle Olympic Games -80
  Profile in the Olympic Encyclopedia
  Sergey Koplyakov's biography and interview
  Profile

1959 births
Living people
People from Orsha
Sportspeople from Vitebsk Region
Honoured Masters of Sport of the USSR
Recipients of the Order of the Red Banner of Labour
Belarusian male freestyle swimmers
Russian male freestyle swimmers
Soviet male freestyle swimmers
Olympic swimmers of the Soviet Union
Swimmers at the 1976 Summer Olympics
Swimmers at the 1980 Summer Olympics
Olympic gold medalists for the Soviet Union
Olympic silver medalists for the Soviet Union
World record setters in swimming
World Aquatics Championships medalists in swimming
European Aquatics Championships medalists in swimming
Medalists at the 1980 Summer Olympics
Medalists at the 1976 Summer Olympics
Olympic gold medalists in swimming
Olympic silver medalists in swimming